Paul Ewald may refer to:

Paul Peter Ewald (1888–1985), German-born American crystallographer and physicist
Paul W. Ewald (born 1950s), American evolutionary biologist